Matman Township, also known as Metman Township, is a township of the Wa Self-Administered Division of Shan State, formerly and conterminously part of Matman District. The capital of the township is Matman.

History
Historically most of the area had been the mountainous and wooded northwestern end of Kengtung State. Prior to 2011 the Township was carved out from parts of Hopang District and Kengtung District.

Further reading
 Myanmar States/Divisions & Townships Overview Map
 Matman Township - Shan State - Mimu

References

Populated places in Shan State
Wa people